Maciej Jankowski (born 4 January 1990) is a Polish footballer who plays as a striker for Wieczysta Kraków.

Career

Jankowski started his junior career with Sarmata Warsaw, before making his first professional steps with KS Piaseczno.

In summer 2010, he joined Ruch Chorzów on a three-year contract deal. After playing for four years at Ruch Chorzów, he played a two year stint at Wisła Kraków and Piast Gliwice before transferring to Arka Gdynia on March 2, 2018 where he plays center-forward.

On 13 January 2022, signed for IV liga club Wieczysta Kraków.

Career statistics

Club

References

External links
 

1990 births
Living people
Footballers from Warsaw
Polish footballers
Poland international footballers
Poland under-21 international footballers
Ekstraklasa players
I liga players
III liga players
IV liga players
Ruch Chorzów players
Wisła Kraków players
Piast Gliwice players
Arka Gdynia players
Stal Mielec players
Association football forwards